Junior High School is a 1978 musical featurette starring P. David Ebersole as Jerry Sanders. The film chronicles the first day of term at a dramatized school of seventh and eighth graders, and consists of seven songs along with several dance numbers. The only member of the cast to become well known later is Paula Abdul, though she played a relatively minor role in the film.

Plot
The story begins with Sherry (Paula Abdul) declaring plans to hold a party that night. Upon hearing about this party, Jerry's friend, Paul (Kirk Burnett) encourages him to ask his crush, Lori Scott (Karen Capelle) to accompany him to the event. On his way to doing this, Jerry encounters several obstacles, including repeated run-ins with Keith (Mikal Robert Taylor), a school bully, and Vicki (Toni Mazarin), an ill-intentioned girl who hopes Jerry will ask her to the party so she can spite a previous boyfriend.

References

External links

Vintage LA Article

1970s musical comedy films
1970s romantic musical films
1978 comedy films
1978 films
American comedy-drama films
American independent films
American musical comedy films
American musical drama films
American romantic musical films
American drama short films
American teen comedy films
American teen drama films
American teen romance films
1970s English-language films
1970s American films